The Atlácatl Battalion was a rapid-response, counter-insurgency battalion of the Salvadoran Army created in 1981. It was implicated in some of the most infamous massacres of the Salvadoran Civil War, and as a result, it was disbanded by the Chapultepec Peace Accords in 1992. It was named after Atlácatl, a legendary indigenous figure from the Spanish conquest of El Salvador.

History 

The Salvadoran Civil War began on 15 October 1979 with the overthrow of President Carlos Humberto Romero. The military established the Revolutionary Government Junta to govern the country in the wake of the coup and it established itself to be a "reformist" junta. The United States was covertly involved in the coup and actively supported the junta.

In January 1981, the Farabundo Martí National Liberation Front (FMLN), a left-wing guerrilla group opposed to the junta, began an offensive against the junta and marched on military targets, most notably the Ilopango Airport. In reaction, the United States increased military and economic assistance to the junta and helped establish the Rapid Deployment Infantry Battalions, a network of specialized counter-insurgent army units. The first unit formed was the Atlácatl Battalion in March 1981, followed by the Atonal Battalion in January 1982 and the Belloso Battalion in May 1982. The battalion was named after Atlácatl, a legendary indigenous figure from the Spanish conquest of El Salvador who fought against conquistador Pedro de Alvarado.

The United States sent fifteen counter-insurgent specialists to El Salvador in March 1981 to train the newly formed battalion. Weapons, ground vehicles, and helicopters were sent to the battalion which numbered around 2,000 soldiers.

The battalion was disbanded in 1992 under the terms of the Chapultepec Peace Accords that ended the twelve-year civil war.

Investigation by the Truth Commission for El Salvador
 
In the early 1990s, the Truth Commission for El Salvador was established by the United Nations to investigate war crimes committed during the civil war. The report concluded that the battalion was responsible for the El Mozote massacre, the El Calabozo massacre, and the 1989 murder of six Jesuit priests. The Battalion was also implicated in the killing of around 50 civilians on the banks of the Guaslinga river. Human Rights Watch independently linked the battalion to additional massacres not cited in the UNTC report including dozens of people killed in Tenancingo and Copapayo in 1983, sixty-eight people killed in Los Llanitos, and three separate killings of civilians in 1989.

See also 

List of massacres in El Salvador

References

Bibliography 

1980 establishments in Panama
Military of El Salvador
Massacres in El Salvador
Salvadoran Civil War
Military units and formations of the Cold War
Military units and formations established in 1980
Military units and formations disestablished in 1992